Beroun is an unincorporated community in Mission Creek Township, Pine County, Minnesota, United States.

Interstate 35 and Pine County Roads 14 and 61 are three of the main routes in the community. I-35 runs north–south, and County Road 14 (Beroun Crossing Road) runs east–west.

Beroun is between Hinckley and Pine City.

A post office called Beroun was established in 1895, and remained in operation until 1993. The community was founded by Czech immigrants, who named it after the town of Beroun in the Czech Republic. Beroun was a station on the Northern Pacific Railroad.

ZIP codes 55063 (Pine City), 55037 (Hinckley), and 55007 (Brook Park) all intersect near Beroun.

References

 Rand McNally Road Atlas – 2007 edition – Minnesota entry
 Official State of Minnesota Highway Map – 2011/2012 edition

Unincorporated communities in Minnesota
Unincorporated communities in Pine County, Minnesota
Czech-American culture in Minnesota